The Communist Movement of Turkey (TKH) is a communist party in Turkey. The TKH was split from the People's Communist Party of Turkey in 2015, which was split from the Communist Party of Turkey in 2014.

The TKH is one of the components in the United June Movement, a political coalition initiative which was founded after Gezi Park revolt.

In August 2022 it was announced in a press conference in Ankara, that the party along with the Communist Party of Turkey, the Revolutionary Party (Turkey) and the Left Party would form a coalition for the 2023 national election, called the Union of Socialist Forces.

See also 

 List of political parties in Turkey

References

External links
 

2015 establishments in Turkey
Communist parties in Turkey
Far-left politics in Turkey
Anti-imperialist organizations
Eurosceptic parties in Turkey
Political parties established in 2015
Republican parties
Secularism in Turkey